KBPY (107.7 FM) is a radio station licensed to Hay Springs, Nebraska, United States. The station is currently owned by Chadrad Communications.

References

External links

BPY
Classic rock radio stations in the United States
Radio stations established in 2011